Plaisance may refer to:

Places

Africa
 Plaisance, Mauritius, the location of Sir Seewoosagur Ramgoolam International Airport
 Plaisance, Seychelles, an administrative district on the island of Mahé

Americas
 Plaisance, Newfoundland and Labrador, or Placentia, Canada
 Plaisance, Quebec, Canada
 Plaisance National Park, Quebec, Canada
 Plaisance, Guyana
 Plaisance Arrondissement, Haiti
 Plaisance, Nord, Haiti
 Plaisance-du-Sud, Haiti
 Plaisance, Louisiana, US
 Plaisance High School

Europe
 Neuilly-Plaisance, Seine-Saint-Denis, France
 Plaisance (Paris Métro), a railway station in Paris, France
 Plaisance, Aveyron, France
 Plaisance, Dordogne, France
 Plaisance, Gers, France
 Plaisance, Vienne, France
 Plaisance-du-Touch, Haute-Garonne, France
 Piacenza, Italy
 Plasencia, Spain

Other uses
 Plaisance of Antioch (c. 1235/6–1261), Queen of Cyprus
 Plaisance (album), by Eddy Grant, 2017